The Fourth Seimas of Lithuania was the fourth parliament (Seimas) elected in Lithuania after it declared independence on 16 February 1918. The elections took place on 9 and 10 June 1936, a bit less than ten years after the Third Seimas was dissolved by President Antanas Smetona. The Seimas commenced its work on 1 September 1936. Its five-year term was cut short on 1 July 1940 when Lithuania lost its independence to the Soviet Union. It was replaced by the People's Seimas in order to legitimize the occupation. Konstantinas Šakenis was the chairman of the Seimas.

Background

After a military coup d'état in 1926, Smetona assumed the power and continued to strengthen his position. In 1935–1936, Smetona's prestige was declining as a trial against 122 Nazi activists in the Klaipėda Region caused Nazi Germany to declare a boycott of Lithuanian imports of agricultural products. This caused an economic crisis in Suvalkija (Southern Lithuania), where farmers engaged in violent protests. Advisers to Smetona tried to convince him that a Seimas could share the criticisms that was aimed solely at the President.

Elections
In early 1936, before the election, all public organizations had to re-register with the government. Political parties, however, were not re-registered and had to close. The Lithuanian Nationalists Union remained the only party in Lithuania. A new electoral law provided that the nominations of the candidates must come not from parties but from counties and municipal councils which were appointed by the central government. The votes were to be cast not for party lists, but for specific individuals. The number of representatives was reduced from 85 to 49. Such changes provided that the Nationalists got 42 seats; remaining seven seats were taken by the Young Lithuania, a youth branch of the Nationalists Union.

The Seimas functioned primarily as an advisory to the President: it debated proposals, made recommendations, and confirmed President's decisions. Its main purpose was to adopt a new constitution. It was accomplished on 11 February 1938. The new constitution provided for even more powers to the president. Up to that point all constitutions defined Lithuania as an independent democratic republic; the 1938 constitution dropped words "democratic" and "republic".

Members
49 men were elected to the Seimas:

References

Legal history of Lithuania
1930s in Lithuania
04